Chughtai Lab is a pathology laboratory chain with centers across Pakistan.

In November 2020, Chughtai Lab signed a Memorandum of Understanding with Pfizer to improve access to vaccines by establishing vaccination centers across Pakistan. In February 2021, Chughtai Lab's director Omar Chughtai announced their intention to import Sputnik V vaccine for commercial sale in Pakistan. In March 2021, Chughtai Lab signed a MoU for providing special discount on all medical and diagnostic facilities for the Khyber Pakhtunkhwa Police.

References

Chughtai Lab Test

Laboratories in Pakistan
Companies associated with the COVID-19 pandemic
Microbiology institutes
Commercial laboratories
Health care companies of Pakistan
Pakistani brands